Mariama White-Hammond is an African-American minister and community activist working on environmental, racial and economic justice issues.  She is the founding pastor of New Roots African Methodist Episcopal Church in Dorchester, Massachusetts.  Prior to her ordination in the AME Church, she was the director of Project HIP-HOP, a youth organization that uses arts as a way to communicate and educate on social justice topics.

Early years

White-Hammond is the daughter of Ray Hammond and Gloria White-Hammond, both medical doctors and ordained ministers in the African Methodist Episcopal Church. Her parents married in 1973. She is the older of two children; her sister is Adiya White-Hammond. 

White-Hammond grew up in the Grove Hall neighborhood of Dorchester, in Boston, Massachusetts.  She became politically aware at a young age. As a teen, she boycotted Coke in support of the anti-apartheid movement in South Africa. She attended the Winsor School, a private college preparatory school in Boston's Fenway, and then Stanford University, where she studied human rights law and international relations.

Activism and ministry

In 2005, White-Hammond became the director of Project HipHop, a community nonprofit that focuses on arts programming for youth of color in Boston.  As a teen, White-Hammond had been a youth member of the organization, which was originally established to educate young people about the history of the civil rights movement.  As director, she helped shift the organization to focus on "cultural organizing", using hip-hop culture and arts to encourage youth to speak out on social justice issues.  In eleven years with the organization, White-Hammond saw first-hand the challenges faced by inner city youth, as two of her students were shot and killed, and another three injured.  

That same year, in 2005, she travelled with the youth of Bethel AME Church to New Orleans, Louisiana, in the wake of Hurricane Katrina.  The service trip served as a catalyst for White-Hammond to begin making connections between environmental concerns and racial and economic justice. She became active in local politics, serving as in 2006 as a ward captain for Deval Patrick's re-election campaign for governor.

In 2014, she decided to pursue ordination, and began studying at Boston University School of Theology, where she completed a Master of Divinity degree in 2017.  While a student, she served as the Minister for Ecological Justice at Bethel AME Church. She was ordained in the African Episcopal Methodist Church prior to her graduation, in April 2016.

Since attending seminary, she has become a recognized leader on issues related to environmentalism and racial justice. She serves as a Fellow of the Green Justice Coalition, working on environmental activism in communities of color.  She was appointed to Massachusetts Attorney General Maura Healy's Racial Justice and Equity Council in 2016.  She lobbied against a natural gas pipeline that was scheduled to be placed in the West Roxbury neighborhood of Boston, and was arrested in a demonstration against the pipeline in 2017, along with 22 other activists, including Karenna Gore, the daughter of former Vice President Al Gore.  

In January 2017, White-Hammond served as the Master of Ceremonies for Boston's Women's March, which was estimated to be the largest protest ever held on Boston Common.  That same year, she was the master of ceremonies for the Boston People's Climate Mobilization. 

Following her father's example, White-Hammond founded New Roots AME Church in Dorchester, in 2018, where she serves as the pastor.

In June 2020, White-Hammond preached at a clergy-organized memorial service held at Bethel AME Church, remembering the lives of three African-Americans who had been killed in spring 2020: George Floyd, Breonna Taylor, and Ahmaud Arbery. The memorial was held following a symbolic funeral procession through the streets of Boston. 

In April 2021, she was appointed to serve as the city of Boston's chief of environment, energy, and open space, a position focused on environmentalism.

Awards 

 Barr Fellowship (2009)
 The Celtics Heroes Among Us (2005)
 The Roxbury Founders Day Award (2004)
 Boston NAACP Image award
 Grist 50 Fixers for 2019
 Sojourners 11 Women Shaping the Church.

References 

African Methodist Episcopal Church clergy

Clergy from Boston
People from Dorchester, Massachusetts
Women Christian clergy
Boston University School of Theology alumni
Winsor School alumni
Stanford University alumni

Year of birth missing (living people)
Living people
21st-century American clergy